Three referendums were held in Switzerland during 1908. The first two were held on 5 July on amending the federal trade law and on banning absinthe. Both were approved by a majority of voters and cantons. The third was held on 25 October on adding article 24bis to the constitution, concerning hydroelectricity and electricity. It was also approved by a majority of voters and cantons.

Background
The referendum on banning Absinthe was a popular initiative, whilst the referendums on the trade law and amending the constitution were mandatory referendums. Both types required a double majority; a majority of the popular vote and majority of the cantons. The decision of each canton was based on the vote in that canton. Full cantons counted as one vote, whilst half cantons counted as half.

Results

Trade law amendment

Absinthe ban

Adding article 24bis to the constitution

References

1908 referendums
1908 in Switzerland
Referendums in Switzerland